The given name Eric, Erich, Erikk, Erik, Erick, or Eirik is derived from the Old Norse name Eiríkr  (or Eríkr  in Old East Norse due to monophthongization).

The first element, ei- may be derived from the older Proto-Norse *aina(z), meaning "one, alone, unique", as in the form Æ∆inrikr explicitly, but it could also be from *aiwa(z) "everlasting, eternity", as in the Gothic form Euric. The second element -ríkr stems either from Proto-Germanic *ríks "king, ruler" (cf. Gothic reiks) or the therefrom derived *ríkijaz "kingly, powerful, rich, prince"; from the common Proto-Indo-European root *h₃rḗǵs. The name is thus usually taken to mean "sole ruler, autocrat" or "eternal ruler, ever powerful". Eric used in the sense of a proper noun meaning "one ruler" may be the origin of Eriksgata, and if so it would have meant "one ruler's journey". The tour was the medieval Swedish king's journey, when newly elected, to seek the acceptance of peripheral provinces.

Eric is one of the most commonly used Germanic names in the United States, along with Robert, William, Edward and others.

The most common spelling across Fennoscandia and in the Netherlands is Erik. In Norway, another form of the name (which has kept the Old Norse diphthong) Eirik is also commonly used. The modern Icelandic version is Eiríkur , while the modern Faroese version is Eirikur.

In Estonia and Finland (where Fenno-Swedish remains an official minority language), the standard Nordic name form Erik is found, but it may also be spelled phonetically as Eerik, in accordance with Finnic language orthography, along with a slew of other unique Balto-Finnic variant forms including Eerikki, Eero, Erki and Erkki.

Although the name was in use in Anglo-Saxon England, its use was reinforced by Scandinavian settlers arriving before the Norman conquest of England. It was an uncommon name in England until the Middle Ages, when it gained popularity, and finally became a common name in the 19th century. This was partly because of the publishing of the novel Eric, or, Little by Little by Frederic Farrar in 1858.

The Latin form of the name is Euricus or Erīcus, which was also adopted into Old Swedish usage (for example, cf. 15th century Kalmar Swedish historian Ericus Olai). Whence come the Greek forms Ερίκος (Eríkos) or Ερρίκος (Erríkos) (both ), in addition to the direct Nordic borrowing Έρικ (Érik).

Éric is used in French, Erico or Errico in Italian, Érico in Portuguese. (Note some phonetically simplified modern forms may be conflated with descendants of cognate name Henry via Henrīcus, Henrik, from Proto-Germanic Haimarīks, sharing the stem *rīks.)

Among Slavic languages, most using the Latin alphabet borrow Erik, but there also exists Polish Eryk. The name is adapted into Cyrillic as Russian Э́йрик (Éyrik) or Э́рик (Érik), and Ukrainian Е́рік (Érik). The Baltic languages use forms such as Latvian Ēriks and Lithuanian Erikas.

And in Germany, Eric, Erik and Erich are used. In South America, the most common spelling is Erick.

In Norway, Sweden and Finland, the name day for derivations of Erik and Eirik is 18 May, commemorating the death of Saint King Eric IX of Sweden, founder of the royal House of Eric.

The feminine derivative is Erica or Erika.

Royalty

Visigothic
Euric, king of the Visigoths between 466 and 484

Danish
Eric I of Denmark, king of Denmark between 1095 and 1103
Eric II of Denmark, king of Denmark between 1134 and 1137
Eric III of Denmark, king of Denmark from 1137 until he abdicated in 1146
Eric IV of Denmark, king of Denmark from 1241 until his murder in 1250
Eric V of Denmark, son of Christopher I, reigned from 1259 to his murder in 1286
Eric VI of Denmark, firstborn son of Eric V, reigned from 1286 to 1319
Eric VII of Denmark, also Eric III of Norway and Eric XIII of Sweden, reigned from 1397 to his deposition in 1439

Norwegian
Eric I of Norway (Eric Bloodaxe), the second king of Norway
Eric II of Norway, the king of Norway from 1280 until 1299
Eric III of Norway, also Eric VII of Denmark and Eric XIII of Sweden
Eiríkr Hákonarson, earl of Lade, ruler of Norway and earl of Northumbria
Erik the Red, the son of Þorvaldr Ásvaldsson

Swedish
Alaric and Eric, two legendary kings of Sweden
Jorund and Eirik, two legendary kings of Sweden
Erik Björnsson, one of the sons of Björn Ironside
Erik Refilsson, Swedish legendary king
Eric Anundsson, Swedish legendary king who ruled during the 9th century, may be the same as Erik Weatherhat, a more or less mythical Swedish king
Eric the Victorious, king of the Swedes during the second half of the 10th century
Eric and Eric, two pretenders around 1066
Eric IX of Sweden, Swedish king between 1150 and 1160, called Saint Eric, Eric the Lawgiver, Eric the Saint, or Eric the Holy
Eric X of Sweden, the King of Sweden between 1208 and 1216
Eric XI of Sweden, the son of king Erik X of Sweden and Richeza of Denmark
Eric XII of Sweden, rival King of Sweden and to his father Magnus IV from 1356 to his death in 1359
Eric XIII of Sweden, Eric of Pomerania
Eric XIV of Sweden, King of Sweden from 1560 until he was deposed in 1568

Given name
Eric, Erich, and Erik are very common given names. The below list is a sampling.

A–E
Erik Acharius, Swedish botanist
Eric Adams, American politician and retired police officer 
Eric the Actor, television actor, radio personality
Eric Adjetey Anang, Ghanaian artist
Erik Affholter (born 1966), American football player
Eric Allen (born 1965), American football coach
Eric Andersen (born 1943), American singer-songwriter
Eric Andersen (artist) (born 1940), Danish artist
Eric Andre, American comedian
Eric Ayala (born 1999), Puerto Rican basketball player
Eric Bana (born 1968), Australian actor
Eric Banks (American football) (born 1998), American football player
Eric Bauza (born 1979), American voice actor
Eric Bazilian (born 1953), American singer, songwriter, arranger and producer, member of The Hooters
Erich Beer (born 1946), German footballer
Eric Benét (born 1966), American singer-songwriter and actor
Eric Bieniemy (born 1969), American football player and coach
 Eric Marlon Bishop, American actor and musician known by the stage name Jamie Foxx
 Eric Arthur Blair, English author known by his pen-name George Orwell
Eric Blore, English character actor
Eric Boe (born 1964), United States Air Force fighter pilot Colonel, test pilot, a Civil Air Patrol member, and a NASA astronaut
Eric Bolling (born 1963), American news commentator
Erik Gustaf Boström (1842–1907), Swedish landowner and politician
Eric DeWayne Boyd (born 1972), American criminal convicted of the kidnapping, rape and murders of Channon Christian and Christopher Newsom
Eric L. Boyd, American software engineer
Erich Brandenberger, German general in the Wehrmacht of Nazi Germany during World War II
Eric R. Braverman (born 1957), American physician
Eric Brodkowitz, Israeli-American baseball pitcher for the Israel national baseball team
Eric "Nick" Bravin (born 1971), American Olympic fencer
Erik Breukink, Dutch racing cyclist
Eric Brewer (ice hockey), Canadian ice hockey player
Erik Bryggman (1891–1955), Finnish architect
Eric Burdon, English vocalist, songwriter and frontman of The Animals
Erick Cabaco, Uruguayan footballer
Erick Castillo, Ecuadorian footballer
Eric Cantona (born 1966), French footballer
Eric Cantor, American politician
Eric Carle, children's author
Erik Carrasco, Chilean basketball player
Eric Maxim Choupo-Moting, Cameroonian footballer
Eric Church, American country music singer and songwriter
Eric Christian Olsen, American actor
Eric Clapton (born 1945), English guitarist, vocalist, and songwriter
 Erick Brian Colón, singer, member of CNCO
Erich Consemüller, German Bauhaus-trained architect and photographer
Éric de Cromières (1953–2020), French sports executive
Eric Decker, American football player
Erik Dekker, Dutch racing cyclist
Erik Del Bufalo, Venezuelan philosopher
Erick Delgado, Peruvian footballer
Erik von Detten (born 1982), former American actor
Eric Dever, American painter
Eric Dickerson, American football player
Eric Dier (born 1994), English footballer
Erik Durm, German footballer
Erik Edman, Swedish footballer
Erik Erikson, German-born American developmental psychologist
Eric Esch, American boxer
Erik Estrada, American actor
Erik Ezelius (born 1986), Swedish politician
Erik Ezukanma (born 2000), American football player

F–L
Erich von Falkenhayn (1861–1922), Chief of the German General Staff during the First World War
Eric Felton, American football player
Erik Ivar Fredholm, Swedish mathematician
Eric Frenzel (born 1988), German Nordic combined skier
Eric Fromm (born 1958), American tennis player
Erich Fromm, German sociologist and writer
Erik Frank, Finnish cyclist
 Eric Friedler (born 1954), American tennis player
Eric Garcia (disambiguation), multiple people
Erich Gonzales (born 1990), Filipina actress
Eric Gonzalez (lawyer), American lawyer
Erik González (born 1991), Dominican baseball player
Eric Gordon (born 1988), American professional basketball player
Eric Gray (disambiguation), multiple people
Erick Green (born 1991), American basketball player in the Israeli Basketball Premier League
Eric Greitens, American politician, author, and Navy SEAL
Eric Griffin (basketball) (born 1990), American basketball player 
Erik Gustaf Geijer, Swedish writer, historian, and composer
Erik Guay, Canadian alpine skier
Eric Hacker, American professional baseball pitcher
Erik Hamrén, Swedish football coach
Eric Harper, New Zealand sportsman
Eric Harris (disambiguation), multiple people
Erich Hartmann, German WWII fighter ace
Eric A. Havelock, British classicist
Eric Hayes, British soldier
Eric Hayes (American football), American football player
Eric Heiden, American speed skater
Erik Heinrichs, Finnish general
Eric Himelfarb, Canadian ice hockey player
Eric Holcomb, American politician
Eric Holle, American football player
 Eric Holmback (1916–1965), American professional wrestler, also known by ring name Yukon Eric
Eric Holtz (born 1965), American Head Coach of the Israel national baseball team
Erich Honecker, (1922–1993), East German leader
Eric Hosmer, American baseball player 
Eric Hutchinson, American singer-songwriter
Eric Idle, English comedian, actor, author, singer, writer, and comedic composer
Eric Jacobson, American puppeteer
Eric Johnson, American guitarist and recording artist
Erik Johnson, American hockey player
Erik Jorpes, Finnish-born Swedish physician and biochemist
Eric Jungmann (born 1981), American actor
Eric Kandel (born 1929), Austrian-American physician and Nobel Prize laureate
Erik Axel Karlfeldt, Swedish Nobel Prize winning poet
Erik Karlsson, Swedish hockey player
Erich Kästner, (1899–1974), German author, poet, screenwriter and satirist
Erik Keedus, Estonian basketball player
Erik Kynard, American high jumper
Eriq La Salle, American actor and director
Erik Lamela, Argentine footballer
Eric Lange, American actor
Eric Larson, American animator for the Walt Disney Studios starting in 1933 and one of the "Disney's Nine Old Men"
Erik Laxmann, Russian explorer of Swedish origin
Eric Liddell, Scottish athlete, rugby union international player, and missionary
Eric Lindell, American singer-songwriter
Eric Lindros, hockey player
Eric Lively (born 1981), American actor
Erik Lorig (born 1986), American football player
Erich Ludendorff, German general and one of the moat significant commanders of World War I

M–Z
Eric Mabius, American actor
Eric Martsolf, American actor
Eric Maskin, American economist and Nobel prize laureate
Erich von Manstein, German field marshal
Erik Mariñelarena, Mexican screenwriter, director and producer
Eric McCormack, American actor
Erik McCoy (born 1997), American football player
Erick McIntosh, American football player
Erik Messerschmidt, American cinematographer
Eric Minkin (born 1950), American-Israeli basketball player
Erik Mongrain, Canadian composer and guitarist
Eric Morecambe, English comedian
Eric Moon, English Librarian
Erich Muhsfeldt, German SS officer at Auschwitz and Majdanek concentration camps executed for war crimes
 Eric Hilliard Nelson (1940–1985), better known as Ricky Nelson, American actor, singer/songwriter and musician
Eric Nam, a Korean American singer-songwriter, entertainer and television presenter
Erick Neres da Cruz, Brazilian footballer
Eric Nkansah, Ghanaian sprinter
Eric Nystrom (born 1983), American hockey player
Eric Owens (bass-baritone), American opera singer
Erik Palladino, American actor
Eric Pardinho, Brazilian professional baseball player
Eric Parker (American football), American football player
Eric Peterson, Canadian actor
Erik Peterson (theologian) (1890–1960), German theologian
Eric Pierpoint, American actor
Eric Pinkins, American football player
Eric Prydz, Swedish disc jockey and producer
Erick Pulgar, Chilean footballer
Eric Ravotti, American football player
Erich Maria Remarque (1898–1970), German writer (All Quiet on the Western Front)
Erik Rhodes (actor, born 1906), American film and Broadway actor
Erich Ribbeck (born 1937), German footballer and coach
Erik Rico, American musician, singer, songwriter, producer, and DJ
Éric Ripert, chef and co-owner of the New York restaurant, Le Bernardin
Eric Roberts, American actor
Eric Rosswood, American activist
Erich Roth (1910–1947), Nazi Gestapo member executed for war crimes
Erich Rudorffer (1917–2016), German Luftwaffe fighter ace
Eric Saade, Swedish singer/songwriter
Erik Satie, French composer
Eric Saubert (born 1994), American football player
Eric Schmidt, billionaire executive chairman of Google
Erik Schmidt (painter), Estonian painter 
Eric Sevareid, American journalist
Eric Singer, American hard rock and heavy metal drummer, best known as a member of Kiss
Erik Solbakken, Norwegian television presenter
Erik Spoelstra (born 1970), Filipino-American professional basketball coach
Eric Staal, Canadian hockey player
Eric Stanley (violinist), American violinist and composer
Eric Steele (born 1954), English football player and coach
Eric Still (born 1967), American football player
Eric Stokes (disambiguation), multiple people
Eric Stoltz, American actor, director and producer
Erik Swanson (born 1993), American baseball player
Eric Sykes, English radio, television and film writer, actor and director
Éric Tabarly (1931–1998), French Navy officer and yachtsman
Eric Thomas (disambiguation), multiple people
Eric Thorne (1862–1922), English singer and actor
Eric Trolle (c. 1460–1530), regent of Sweden in 1512
Eric Trolle (1863–1934), Swedish diplomat 
Eric Tsang, Hong Kong film actor, producer and director
Erik Turner, rhythm guitarist of glam metal band Warrant
Erick Thohir, Indonesian businessman and entrepreneur
Erik Valdez, American actor
Eric Vale, voice actor and script writer
Erik Verlinde, Dutch theoretical physicist
Erik De Vlaeminck, Belgian racing cyclist
Erick Silva, Brazilian mixed martial artist
Erick Wainaina, Kenyan long-distance runner
Erich Wasicky, German SS pharmacist at Mauthausen concentration camp in charge of gassing victims and was executed.
Eric Welsh, intelligence officer
Eric Wennström, Swedish hurdler
Eric Whitacre, composer and conductor
Erik White, American director
Erik White (Canadian football), Canadian football player
E. B. Wikramanayake, Sri Lankan Sinhala politician and lawyer
Eric Wikramanayake, Sri Lankan Sinhala conservationist
Eric Wilkerson, American football player
Erik Adolf von Willebrand, Finnish internist (von Willebrand disease)
Eric Winstanley (1944–2021), English footballer
 Eric Lynn Wright, American rapper known as Eazy-E
Eric Yuan (born 1969/70), American billionaire, founder and CEO of Zoom Video Communications
Erik Zabel (born 1970), German cyclist
Eric Zinterhofer (born 1971), American private equity financier
Erik de Zwart, Dutch radio and television maker

Fictional characters
 Eric, a character in the 2002 American coming-of-age romantic drama movie A Walk to Remember
 Erik the Red, fictional Shi'ar character in the Marvel Comics comic book universe
 Eric, a character from the video game Zero Time Dilemma
Erik, the titular character in Gaston Leroux's 1910 novel The Phantom of the Opera
 Erik, a Reindeer villager from the video game series Animal Crossing
Flat Eric, low-tech, yellow puppet character from Levi's commercials for Sta-Prest One Crease Denim Clothing
 Eric Birling, son of Arthur Birling in J B Priestley's play An Inspector Calls
 Eric Blonowitz, a character in the Nickelodeon sitcom Drake & Josh
Eric Brooks, also known as Blade in the Marvel Universe
Blade (New Line Blade franchise character)
Blade (Marvel Cinematic Universe)
Eric Cartman, one of the four main characters in the TV series South Park
 Eric Duckman, titular character from the TV series Duckman
Eric Foreman, major character from the TV series House M.D.
Eric Forman (That '70s Show), the main character in That 70s Show
Eric Gibb, a character in the 1986 American fantasy drama film The Boy Who Could Fly
General Erich Von Klinkerhoffen, the boss of Colonel Kurt Von Strohm, Captain Alberto Bertorelli, Captain Hans Geering and Lieutenant Hubert Gruber in the TV series 'Allo 'Allo!
 Eric McGowen, a character in the 1994 American martial arts drama movie The Next Karate Kid
Eric Murphy, fictional character on the comedy-drama television series Entourage
Eric Northman, the love interest of Sookie Stackhouse in the Southern Vampire Mysteries novels and the TV series True Blood
Eric Draven, the undead avenger of his and his fiancée's murder in the movie The Crow
Erik Von Darkmoor, fictional character appearing in the novels of Raymond E. Feist
Erik Lehnsherr, also known as Magneto in the Marvel Universe
Eric Matthews, a main character from the TV series Boy Meets World and its spinoff Girl Meets World
 Erik Pinksterblom, the main character in Erik of het klein insectenboek
Eric Myers, a character in Power Rangers Time Force
Erik "Killmonger" Stevens, a Marvel Comics supervillain and the main antagonist of Black Panther
Eric Thursley, a thirteen-year-old demonologist and the titular character of the Discworld novel Eric'×'
Eric van der Woodsen, Gossip Girl character
 Erik, a thief as well as one of the main companions of the protagonist in the video game, Dragon Quest XI Eric Yorkie, a character in novel series TwilightPrince Eric, the love interest of Princess Ariel in the Disney movie, The Little Mermaid Eric Praline, a recurring character in the television show Monty Python's Flying Circus''
Eric, the names of Mr Praline's pet dog, cat, halibut, and fruit bat in the sketch "Fish Licence"
Eric the Half-a-Bee, another of Mr Praline's pets

Surname
Dobrica Erić (1936–2019), Serbian writer
Elspeth Eric (1907–1993), American actress
Jelena Erić (born 1979), Serbian handball player
Micheal Eric (born 1988), Nigerian basketball player
Nenad Erić (born 1982), Serbian football goalkeeper
Slađana Erić (born 1983), Serbian volleyball player
Zoran Erić (born 1950), Serbian composer

See also
Arik
Aric
Éric
Euric
Frederick (given name)

References

English-language masculine given names
English masculine given names
Danish masculine given names
Dutch masculine given names
German masculine given names
Norwegian masculine given names
Scandinavian masculine given names
Swedish masculine given names